A space habitat (or habitation module) in a basic sense is any facility fulfilling habitational purposes in outer space. It is not to be confused with an extended space habitat, an arrangement of or infrastructure for multiple habitation facilities, in the sense of a space settlement. Space stations or theoretical extraterrestrial stations, such as a Moonbase or Mars habitat, include or are basic space habitats.

The ISS was planned to get a now canceled dedicated Habitation Module.

Space tourism is expected to place dedicated habitats into space. The Axiom Orbital Segment will be a commercial habitation extension of the ISS for purposes such as tourism, but also commercial research.

Particularly inflatable space habitats have been in development. Based on the earlier NASA TransHab design, inflatable habitats have been developed and tested in orbit by the now inactive company Bigelow Aerospace.

Extraterrestrial surface habitation 

The only extraterrestrial surface habitats that sofar have been erected were the temporary Apollo Lunar Modules, such as Eagle of Tranquility Base, the very first.

See also
 Bioastronautics
 Controlled ecological life-support system
 Closed ecological system
 Earth systems engineering and management
 Human analog missions
 Human presence in space
 Life support system
 List of Mars analogs
 Mars analog habitat
 Mars habitability analogue environments on Earth
 Planetary surface construction
 Space architecture
 Space infrastructure
 Terrestrial analogue sites
 Underground construction
 Underwater habitat

References

Space technology